Liselotte "Lotta" Lennartsson (born 23 September 1987 in Karlstad) is a Swedish curler. She was lead for the Swedish team at the 2008 World Junior Curling Championships in Östersund, winning a silver medal. She is lead for the Swedish team at the 2010 Ford World Women's Curling Championship in Swift Current, Canada.

References

External links
 

Swedish female curlers
Living people
1987 births
World curling champions